Dual specificity tyrosine-phosphorylation-regulated kinase 1B is an enzyme that in humans is encoded by the DYRK1B gene.

Function 

DYRK1B is a member of the DYRK family of protein kinases.  DYRK1B contains a bipartite nuclear localization signal and is found mainly in muscle and testis.  The protein is proposed to be involved in the regulation of nuclear functions.  Three isoforms of DYRK1B have been identified differing in the presence of two alternatively spliced exons within the catalytic domain.

Interactions 

DYRK1B has been shown to interact with:
 PCBD1  and
 RANBP9.

Clinical significance 

One lone missense mutation in Dyrk1B gene (R102C) was found associated with an autosomal dominant early onset Coronary Artery Disease, juvenile-onset truncal obesity, severe hypertension, and type II diabetes mellitus - seen in subjects from a nomadic group in Iran.

See also
DYRK1A
DYRK2

References

Further reading